Icon & the Black Roses is the debut studio album by Portuguese band Icon & The Black Roses. It was released on June 15, 2004, following a demo released 2001 and an EP released in 2003.

In this early period the band recorded a demo called “4 Winter Songs” which allowed them to secure a deal with Dark-Wings records in 2001. Dark-Wings requested a 5 Track CD to be edited in Germany, so the band spent time in studios in Lisbon, Hamburg and Tenerife recording the debut EP.

Dark-Wings decided later that year to extend the release to a full album. The band flew to Berlin to record the extra material and on June 15, 2004, their self-titled debut album was released by Dark-Wings with distribution by SPV.

Track listing

Personnel

Icon & the Black Roses 
 Johnny Icon – lead vocals
 Sebastian Noir – guitars
 Sean Rose – bass
 Adam Nox – keyboards
 Mike Thorn - drums

Guest 
 Daniel Zimmerman – drums

References

External links
http://www.iconandtheblackroses.com/album/icon-the-black-roses/

2004 debut albums
Icon & The Black Roses albums